THX or thx may refer to:

 THX, a US audio company
 THX 1138, a film by George Lucas
 Electronic Labyrinth: THX 1138 4EB, a film by George Lucas
 "Thanks" in SMS language